Mamuka Machavariani (born 27 November 1970) is a retired Georgian professional football player.

1970 births
Living people
Footballers from Georgia (country)
Georgia (country) international footballers
FC Dinamo Tbilisi players
Association football defenders